The 2019 SMP Russian Circuit Racing Series was the sixth season of the Russian Circuit Racing Series, organized by SMP Racing. It was the fifth season with TCR class cars.

Teams and drivers
Yokohama was the official tyre supplier.

Touring / TCR Russian Touring Car Championship
All teams and drivers were Russian-registered.

Super Production & Touring-Light
All teams and drivers are Russian-registered.

S1600
All teams and drivers are Russian-registered.

S1600 Junior
All teams and drivers are Russian-registered and used the cars Volkswagen Polo Se.

Calendar and results
The 2019 schedule was announced on 21 November 2018, with all events scheduled to be held in Russia.

Championship standings

Scoring systems

Touring / TCR Russian Touring Car Championship
In the Russian Championship only pilots with a Russian racing license earn points, foreign pilots take part only in conducted at five stages in Nizhny Novgorod, Smolensk, ADM, Moscow and Sochi. The winner of the international classification was Dmitry Bragin, the second Klim Gavrilov and the third Kirill Ladygin.

† – Drivers did not finish the race, but were classified as they completed over 75% of the race distance.

Touring / TCR Russian Touring Car Championship Team's Standings

Super Production

Super Production Teams' Standings

Touring Light

Touring Light Teams' Standings

S1600

S1600 Teams' standings

Footnotes

References

External links
 

Russian Circuit Racing Series
Russian Circuit Racing Series
Russian Circuit Racing Series
Russian Circuit Racing Series